Nicoleta-Lavinia Rolea (born 10 October 1986) is a Romanian racing cyclist. She rode at the 2014 UCI Road World Championships, having won the Romanian National Road Race Championships earlier in the year, but failed to finish in Ponferrada. She also finished second twice in the National Road Race Championships (2008 and 2015), and was a three-time runner-up in the Romanian National Time Trial Championships, in 2009, 2014 and 2015.

References

External links
 
 Lavinia Rolea in The Encyclopedia of Romanian Athletes

1986 births
Living people
Romanian female cyclists
Place of birth missing (living people)